Cordalia is an extant  genus of aleocharine rove beetle in the tribe Falagriini. It was discovered by Jacobs.

Species
These three species belong to the genus Cordalia:
 Cordalia obscura (Gravenhorst, 1802) i c g b
 Cordalia permutata Assing, 2002 g
 Cordalia taiwanensis Pace, 2008 g
Data sources: i = ITIS, c = Catalogue of Life, g = GBIF, b = Bugguide.net

References

Monotypic Aleocharinae genera
Beetles described in 1925